Ernst Torgler (or Ernest R. Torgler) (December 28, 1837 - August 3, 1923) was an American soldier who fought in the American Civil War. Torgler received his country's highest award for bravery during combat, the Medal of Honor. Torgler's medal was won for saving his commanding officer from capture at the Battle of Ezra Church in Georgia, on July 28, 1864. He was honored with the award on May 10, 1894.

Torgler was born in Mecklenburg, Germany, and entered service in Toledo, Ohio, where he was later buried.

Medal of Honor citation

See also
List of American Civil War Medal of Honor recipients: T–Z

References

1837 births
1923 deaths
American Civil War recipients of the Medal of Honor
Burials in Ohio
German-born Medal of Honor recipients
German emigrants to the United States
People from Mecklenburg
People of Ohio in the American Civil War
Union Army officers
United States Army Medal of Honor recipients